Moldavian Subcarpathians is a geographic area located in the northeast of Romania, to the east of the Eastern Carpathian Mountains. The Moldavian Subcarpathians are considered to be part of the Moldavian Plateau. They are composed of:

 
 
 
 
 
 
 
 
 
 Oușuru Hills
 Zabranț Hills
 Răchitaș Hills

The Moldavian Subcarpathians are separated from the rest of the Moldavian Plateau by the Siret and Moldova River valleys (north and east), and are bounded by the Curvature Subcarpathians to the south.
Regions of Europe

References
 
 

Geography of Romania
Eastern Carpathians